The gastric mucosal barrier is the property of the stomach that allows it to safely contain the gastric acid required for digestion.

If the barrier is broken, as by acetylsalicylic acid (ASA, aspirin) in acid solution, acid diffuses back into the mucosa where it can cause damage to the stomach itself.

The barrier consists of three protective components. These provide the additional resistance for the mucosal surface of the stomach. The three components include:

 A compact epithelial cell lining. Cells in the epithelium of the stomach are bound by tight junctions that repel harsh fluids that may injure the stomach lining.
 A special mucus covering, derived from mucus secreted by surface epithelial cells and Foveolar cells.  This insoluble mucus forms a protective gel-like coating over the entire  surface of the gastric mucosa. The mucus protects the gastric mucosa from autodigestion by e.g. pepsin and from  erosion by acids and other caustic materials that are ingested.
 Bicarbonate ions, secreted by the surface epithelial cells.  The bicarbonate ions act to neutralize harsh acids.

Factors that can damage the barrier 

- Bacterial Infection by Helicobacter pylori

- Alcohol

- Non Steroidal Anti-Inflammatory Drugs (NSAIDs) like aspirin

See also 
Alkaline mucus

References

Further reading 
The gastric mucosal barrier 
Immunabwehr (in German)

Digestive system